Wig Out At Denkos is the second studio album by the American melodic hardcore band Dag Nasty, released in 1987 on Dischord Records.

It was remastered and re-released on CD with bonus tracks in 2002.

Track listing
Side one
"The Godfather" - 3:21
"Trying" - 1:59
"Safe" - 3:07
"Fall" - 2:53
"When I Move" - 1:53
Side two
"Simple Minds" - 2:01
"Wig Out at Denkos" - 3:15
"Exercise" - 3:35
"Dag Nasty" - 3:15
"Crucial Three" - 2:46

2002 CD reissue bonus tracks
"Safe (Alternate Version)" - 3:14 
"Trying (Alternate Version)" - 1:48
"Fall (Alternate Version)" - 2:52
"Roger (Alternate Version)" - 1:12 
"Mango (Alternate Version)" - 2:19
"When I Move (Live Acoustic Version)" - 2:00
"I've Heard (Live Acoustic Version)" - 0:52

Personnel
Dag Nasty
Peter Cortner - vocals
Brian Baker - guitars
Doug Carrion - bass
Colin Sears - drums
Ian MacKaye - producer
Don Zientara - producer

References

Dag Nasty albums
1987 albums